The men's 4×100 metre medley relay event at the 2000 Summer Olympics took place on 22–23 September at the Sydney International Aquatic Centre in Sydney, Australia.

Since the event's inception in 1960, the U.S. team dominated the race from the start to demolish a four-year-old world record and most importantly, to defend their Olympic title. Lenny Krayzelburg (53.87), Ed Moses (59.84), Ian Crocker (52.10), and Gary Hall, Jr. (47.92, an American) put together a blazing fast finish of 3:33.73 to cut off their own standard by 1.11 seconds. Moses also produced a mighty effort in the breaststroke leg as he became the first ever swimmer to record a sub one-minute barrier split. After accepting their golds in front of the Aussie home crowd, the U.S. men unfurled a banner reading: "Sydney 2000. In our hearts forever. Thanks Australia."

The Aussie team of Matt Welsh (54.29), Regan Harrison (1:01.48), Geoff Huegill (51.33), and Michael Klim (48.17) finished behind their greatest rivals by a couple of seconds, but made a surprise packet with the silver in an Oceanian record of 3:35.27. Meanwhile, Stev Theloke (55.07), Jens Kruppa (1:00.52), Thomas Rupprath (52.14), and Torsten Spanneberg (48.15) earned their first medley relay medal for Germany since the nation's reunification in 1990, taking home the bronze in a European record of 3:35.88.

Netherlands' Klaas-Erik Zwering (56.83), Marcel Wouda (1:01.20), Joris Keizer (52.26), and anchor Pieter van den Hoogenband (47.24, the fastest split of the race) missed the podium by more than a full body length over the Germans with a fourth-place time of 3:37.53. Hungary (3:39.03), Canada (3:39.88), France (3:40.02), and Great Britain (3:40.19) completed a close finish at the rear of the championship finale.

Records
Prior to this competition, the existing world and Olympic records were as follows.

The following new world and Olympic records were set during this competition.

Results

Heats

Final

References

External links
Official Olympic Report

M
4 × 100 metre medley relay
Men's events at the 2000 Summer Olympics